Mount Colburn is an Antarctic mountain,  high, rising above the east-central part of Shepard Island, off the coast of Marie Byrd Land. It was mapped from the USS Glacier on February 4, 1962, and named by the Advisory Committee on Antarctic Names for Lieutenant Richard E. Colburn, U.S. Navy, Communications Officer on the Glacier.

References
 

Mountains of Marie Byrd Land